

Events

Buildings and structures

Buildings
 1440s
 Great Tower of Tattershall Castle, Lincolnshire, England, is probably largely completed.
 Wilcote Chapel of St Mary's Church, North Leigh, Oxfordshire, England, is built.
 1440
 Guildhall, London, is completed.
 Sidi Yahya Mosque in Timbuktu is completed.
 St. Nicolai, Lüneburg, is completed.
 1441
 The nave of the Church of the Holy Spirit, Heidelberg, Germany (begun in 1410), is completed.
 Construction of Herstmonceux Castle in England is begun.
 1442
 The Porta della Carta, built by Giovanni and his son Bartolomeo Bon, completes the Doge's Palace, Venice.
 Chapel of All Souls College, Oxford, consecrated.

 1443 – The Castle of Zafra is completed.
 1445
 Church of San Pablo, Valladolid is begun.
 Palazzo Medici in Florence is begun by Michelozzo.
 1446
 July 25 – The foundation stone of King's College Chapel, Cambridge, England is laid by King Henry VI of England.
 Precious Belt Bridge in China reconstructed.
 Approximate date
 Jama Masjid of Herat in Afghanistan is completed
 Construction of Palazzo Rucellai in Florence, probably designed by Leon Battista Alberti and executed, at least in part, by Bernardo Rossellino, is begun.
 Construction of Ockwells Manor in Berkshire, England, is begun.
 1446–1450 – Reconstruction of choir of Mont Saint Michel Abbey in Normandy is begun.
 c. 1447 – Llotja dels Mercaders (Silk Exchange) in Palma, Majorca, designed by Guillem Sagrera, completed.

Births
 c. 1440 – Reginald Bray born in Worcester, England (d. 1503)
 c. 1443 – Giuliano da Sangallo born in Florence (d. 1516)
 c. 1444 – Donato Bramante born in Monte Asdrualdo (modern-day Fermignano), Italy  (d. 1514)

Deaths
 1446: April 16 – Filippo Brunelleschi dies in Florence (b. 1377)

References

Architecture